(born January 5, 1965) is a Japanese veteran suit actor. He did some stunt work for Kamen Rider Series, Super Sentai and Metal Hero.

Stunt/suit actor roles

Super Sentai series
 Dengeki Sentai Changeman (1985-1986) - Hidrer Soldiers
 Hikari Sentai Maskman (1987-1988) - Black Mask
 Choujuu Sentai Liveman (1988-1989) - Black Bison
 Chikyuu Sentai Fiveman (1990-1991) - Five Black, Dongoros
 Kyoryu Sentai Zyuranger (1992-1993) - Dragon Ranger, Mammoth Ranger
 Choriki Sentai Ohranger (1995-1996) - Bacchus Wrath, King Ranger
 Denji Sentai Megaranger (1997-1998) - Mega Winger, Mega Black, Yugande
 Seijuu Sentai Gingaman (1998-1999) - Ginga Blue, Gingarilla, Captain Zahab, Gingaoh
 Kyuukyuu Sentai GoGoFive (1999-2000) - Victory Mars, Grand Liner, Salamandes
 Mirai Sentai Timeranger (2000-2001) - Time Fire, V-Rex Robo, Don Dolnero
 Hyakujuu Sentai Gaoranger (2001-2002) - Gao Black
 Ninpuu Sentai Hurricanger (2002-2003) - Shurikenger
 Bakuryuu Sentai Abaranger (2003-2004) - Abare Black, Giledon
 Tokusou Sentai Dekaranger (2004-2005) - Igaroid
 Mahou Sentai Magiranger (2005-2006) - Magi Shine, Sunjiel, Buranken, Drake, Dagon, Travelion
 GoGo Sentai Boukenger (2006-2007) - Dai Bouken, Ryuuwon, Super Dai Bouken, Ultimate Dai Bouken, Yaiba, DaiVoyager
 Juken Sentai Gekiranger (2007-2008) - Geki Chopper, Saidaioh
 Engine Sentai Go-onger (2008-2009) - Yogoshimacritein, Kyoretsu-Oh
 Samurai Sentai Shinkenger (2009-2010) - Shinken Gold, Daikaioh, Mougyudaioh
 Tensou Sentai Goseiger (2010-2011) - Gosei Knight, Dereputa, Gosei Ground
 Kaizoku Sentai Gokaiger (2011-2012) - Barizorg, Akudos Gill
 Tokumei Sentai Go-Busters (2012-2013) - Gorisaki Banana
 Zyuden Sentai Kyoryuger (2013-2014) - Torin, Kyoryu Silver
 Ressha Sentai ToQger (2014-2015) - General Schwarz, Toq-6gou, Build DaiOh
 Shuriken Sentai Ninninger (2015-2016) - Star Ninger, Raizo Gabi, Bison King, Lion Ha-Oh, Shurikenger (43)
 Doubutsu Sentai Zyuohger (2016-2017) - Azurdo
 Uchu Sentai Kyuranger (2017-2018) - Oushi Black/Champ

Kamen Rider series
 Kamen Rider Black (1987-1988) - Kamen Rider Black
 Kamen Rider Black RX (1988-1989) - Kamen Rider Black RX
 Shin Kamen Rider: Prologue (1992) - Kamen Rider Shin
 Kamen Rider ZO (1993) - Kamen Rider ZO
 Kamen Rider J (1994) - Kamen Rider J
 Kamen Rider World (1994) - Kamen Rider ZO, Kamen Rider J
 Kamen Rider Agito (2001-2002) - Kamen Rider G3 Mild
 Kamen Rider Agito: Project G4 (2001) - Kamen Rider G4
 Kamen Rider Ryuki (2002-2003) - Kamen Rider Ouja, Kamen Rider Odin
 Kamen Rider Ryuki: Episode Final (2002) - Kamen Rider Ouja, Kamen Rider Ryuga
 Kamen Rider 555 (2003-2004) - Crocodile Orphnoch, Rose Orphnoch, Kamen Rider Delta (Sub)
 Kamen Rider Blade (2004-2005) - Kamen Rider Leangle
 Kamen Rider Blade: Missing Ace (2004) - Kamen Rider Leangle
 Kamen Rider Kabuto (2006-2007) - Kamen Rider Drake, ZECTroopers
 Kamen Rider Kabuto: God Speed Love (2006) - Kamen Rider Caucasus
 Kamen Rider Den-O (2007-2008) - Kintaros/Kamen Rider Den-O Ax Form
 Kamen Rider Den-O: I'm Born! (2007) - Kintaros/Kamen Rider Den-O Ax Form
 Kamen Rider Kiva (2008-2009) - Kamen Rider Ixa
 Kamen Rider Den-O & Kiva: Climax Deka (2008) - Kintaros, Kamen Rider Nega Den-O/Negataros
 Kamen Rider Kiva: King of the Castle in the Demon World (2008) - Kamen Rider Ixa
 Saraba Kamen Rider Den-O: Final Countdown (2008) - Kintaros/Kamen Rider Den-O Ax Form
 Kamen Rider Decade (2009) - Kamen Rider Black, Kamen Rider Black RX, Kamen Rider Delta, Kintaros/Kamen Rider Den-O Ax Form, Kamen Rider Drake, Kamen Rider Delta, Kamen Rider Leangle, Kamen Rider Odin, Kamen Rider Ouja, Kamen Rider Ryuga, Shinken Gold (Episode 24, 25)
 Cho Kamen Rider Den-O & Decade Neo Generations: The Onigashima Warship (2009) - Kintaros, Goludora, Kamen Rider Caucasus
 Kamen Rider Decade: All Riders vs. Dai-Shocker (2009) - Kamen Rider Black, Kamen Rider Black RX, Kamen Rider Shin, Kamen Rider ZO, Kamen Rider J, Kamen Rider Ouja, Kamen Rider Ixa, Shadow Moon, Ikadevil, Garagaranda
 Kamen Rider × Kamen Rider W & Decade: Movie War 2010 (2009) - Kamen Rider J, Masquerade Dopant
 Kamen Rider × Kamen Rider × Kamen Rider The Movie: Cho-Den-O Trilogy (2010) - Kintaros, Kamen Rider Caucasus, Piggies Imagin
 OOO, Den-O, All Riders: Let's Go Kamen Riders (2011) - Kintaros, Kamen Rider Black RX, Shadow Moon, Kamen Rider Birth
 Kamen Rider OOO (2010-2011) - Kamen Rider Birth
 Kamen Rider × Kamen Rider Fourze & OOO: Movie War Mega Max (2011) - Super Gingaoh
 Kamen Rider × Super Sentai: Super Hero Taisen (2012) - Kamen Rider Black RX, Kintaros/Kamen Rider Den-O Ax Form, Akudos Gill, Kamen Rider Birth
 Kamen Rider Gaim (2013-2014) - Kamen Rider Knuckle
 Heisei Riders vs. Shōwa Riders: Kamen Rider Taisen feat. Super Sentai (2014) - General Schwarz
 Kamen Rider Drive (2014-2015) - Heart Roidmude
 Kamen Rider Zi-O (2018-2019) - Another Decade
 Kamen Rider Saber (2020-2021) - Kamen Rider Buster

Metal Hero series
 Choujinki Metalder (1987) Seiko Seno Stunt Double,  Phantom
 Tokkyuu Shirei Solbrain (1991-1992) Knight Fire
 Tokusou Robo Janperson (1993-1994) Bill Goldy
 Juukou B-Fighter (1995-1996) Black Beet, Blue Beet
 B-Fighter Kabuto (1996-1997) Descorpion, B-Fighter Min

Normal Roles

Kamen Rider Black (1988)  A man manipulated by Bilgenia
Tokusou Exceedraft (1992) Jewel thief 
Tokusou Robo Janperson (1993) Zhen Combat-Da Guang
Blue SWAT (1994) - resistance, Wadi,  Gilgavision commands
Juukou B-Fighter (1995)  Hammer kong (voice), Combat-Mecha Gamerio (Human Form)
B-Robo Kabutack (1997) Fighting Robot
Kamen Rider Kuuga (2002) Sniper
Kamen Rider Ryuki (2000)  Black-suited man, Coast Guard officer 
Kamen Rider 555 (2004) Riotrooper member
Tokusou Sentai Dekaranger (2004) Policeman, Alienizer
Kamen Rider Den-O (2007) Dojo Owner 
Kamen Rider × Kamen Rider W & Decade: Movie War 2010 (2010) Gaia Memory Distributor
Zyuden Sentai Kyoryuger (2014) - Civilian
Reach Beyond the Blue Sky (2021) - Kijūrō

References 
 https://web.archive.org/web/20121129055442/http://supersentai.com/cast/pfl-jirookamoto.htm

Living people
Japanese male film actors
1965 births